Patricia Mayr-Achleitner was the defending champion, but chose not to participate.
Nastassya Burnett won the title, defeating Eva Birnerová 6–1, 6–3 in the final.

Seeds

Main draw

Finals

Top half

Bottom half

References
 Main Draw
 Qualifying Draw

ITS Cup - Singles
ITS Cup